see also: Organization of the Air Service of the American Expeditionary Force
When the United States entered World War I on 6 April 1917, the Air Service of the United States Army existed only as a branch of the Signal Corps, and was known by the name of Aviation Section, U.S. Signal Corps. It consisted of 1,120 personnel, of which 65 were officers. The Army was not ready for the deployment of aviation forces to Europe, and it became necessary to prepare after President Woodrow Wilson's declaration of war.

Overview

As part of the buildup of US forces, aviation units were formed into aero squadrons primarily at Kelly Field, San Antonio, Texas, with additional units being formed at Rockwell Field, San Diego, California. Once formed, and prior to their deployment to Europe, Camp Taliaferro, north of Fort Worth, Texas, and several airfields near Toronto, Ontario, Canada were used by the British Royal Flying Corps (RFC) to perform flight training for the new aero squadrons. Camp Hancock, near Augusta, Georgia, was used for training service squadrons of aircraft mechanics as well as flight training.

When ordered to deploy, units departed though Garden City, New York, which was the primary port of embarkment. Units there were loaded onto transport ships for the trans-Atlantic crossing. Upon arrival in Europe, Liverpool, England, and Brest, France, were the primary ports of disembarkation, although other ports were also used. Some aero squadrons arriving in England received additional training from the Royal Flying Corps, and later the Royal Air Force (RAF) once it was established, and were then attached to British squadrons, deploying with them to France. Others received further training and were sent to Winchester, Hampshire, where they awaited their cross-channel transfer to France, using the port of Southampton.

After deployment to France, Air Service Replacement Concentration Barracks in St. Maixent was the primary reception center for new aero squadrons assigned to the American Expeditionary Force (AEF). There, units were classified as pursuit, bombardment or as observation units. Once processed, units were sent to one of several Air Instructional Centers (AIC) where they received additional training, then/or to the First Corps Observation Group School on Amanty Aerodrome or to the First Pursuit Organization and Training Center on Villeneuve-les-Vertus Aerodrome.

After assignment, the Air Service's deployed units operated from grass aerodromes, at first using airfields already built by the French "Aéronautique Militaire", then from new aerodromes purposely built for the American forces. The exact location of many of these aerodromes is no longer certain as many archives have since disappeared, and as the facilities were only temporary, most of the traces have long vanished through ploughing.

After the Armistice came into effect in November 1918, the wartime Air Service was demobilized. This process was completed within a year and the National Defense Act of 1920 then established the United States Army Air Service on a permanent basis, with several new units being formed. Later, some of the temporary wartime units were consolidated to retain the lineage and honors of their wartime service with the AEF.

Stations
Below is a list of the barracks and aerodromes used by the American Expeditionary Force that were sent to France during World War I. Most of the headquarters and command services used barracks or requisitioned properties not linked with flying grounds, yet some where installed on airfields as in Souilly, Saizerais or in Toul, where the "Gengoult" barracks had been built by the French "Aeronautique Militaire" on the northern edge of the Croix de Metz airfields (misspelt for "Gengault").

American sector

Command and control
 Headquarters, Air Service, AEF, Chaumont, Champagne-Ardenne
 First Army Air Service 
 Organized at: La Ferté-sous-Jouarre, Île-de-France, 10 August 1918
 Moved to: Ligny-en-Barrois, Lorraine, 25 August 1918
 Moved to: Souilly, Lorraine, 21 September – 11 November 1918

 Second Army Air Service 
 Organized at: Toul, Lorraine, 12 October – 11 November 1918

 Third Army Air Service
 Organized at: Ligny-en-Barrois, Lorraine, 14 November 1918
 Moved to: Longuyon, Lorraine, 22 November 1918
 Moved to Germany.

 I Corps, Air Service, First Army 
 Organized at: Neufchâteau, Lorraine, 10 February 1918
 Moved to: La Ferté-sous-Jouarre, Île-de-France, 1 July 1918
 Moved to: Coincy, Picardy, 10 August 1918
 Moved to: Toul, Lorraine, 16 August 1918
 Moved to: Saizerais, Lorraine, 2 September 1918
 Moved to: Rarécourt, Lorraine, 12 September 1918
 Moved to: Chéhéry, Champagne-Ardenne, 2–11 November 1918

 III Corps, Air Service, First Army 
 Organized at: Château-Thierry, Picardy, 2 August 1918
 Moved to: Goussancourt, Picardy, 1 September 1918
 Moved to: Malancourt, Lorraine, 24 October 1918
 Moved to: Dun-sur-Meuse, Lorraine, 10–11 November 1918

 V Corps, Air Service, First Army 
 Organized at: Luxeuil-les-Bains, Franche-Comté, 7 August 1918
 Moved to: Souilly, Lorraine, 7 September 1918
 Moved to: Fauconcourt, Lorraine, 20 September 1918
 Moved to: Ville-sur-Cousances, Lorraine, 22 September 1918
 Moved to: Cheppy, Lorraine, 31 October – 11 November 1918

 VI Corps, Air Service, First Army 
 Located at: Saizerais, Lorraine, 23 October – 11 November 1918

Combat aerodromes

 Amanty Aerodrome	
 Located  NW of Amanty, Meuse
 French, then American Air Service training and operational airfield 
 I Corps Observation Group School
 Headquarters, I Corps Observation Group, 2 February-3 May 1918
 Headquarters, 1st Day Bombardment Group, 10–25 September 1918
 1st Aero Squadron (training), 19 October 1917 – 4 April 1918
 91st Aero Squadron (training), 14 December 1917 – 24 May 1918
 88th Aero Squadron (training), 1 February – 28 May 1918
 12th Aero Squadron (training, then observation), 2 February – 3 May 1918
 90th Aero Squadron (training), 19 April – 13 June 1918
 99th Aero Squadron (Observation School), 31 May – 1 July 1918
 135th Aero Squadron (training), 19–30 July 1918
 8th Aero Squadron (training), 31 July – 31 August 1918 
 50th Aero Squadron (training), 27 July – 4 September 1918
 104th Aero Squadron (training), 1–4 August 1918
 9th Aero Squadron (Night Army Observation) 28 August – 21 September 1918
 96th Aero Squadron (Day Bombardment), 18 May – 23 September 1918
 20th Aero Squadron (Day Bombardment), 7–23 September 1918
 11th Aero Squadron (Day Bombardment), 6–24 September 1918
 166th Aero Squadron (Day Bombardment), 21–25 September 1918

 Autreville Aerodrome  
 Located  SSW of Autreville, Vosges
 RAF operational, then American Air Service training and operational airfield
 168th Aero Squadron (training) 2 Sept 1918 - 5 Oct 1918
 186th Aero Squadron (training), 18 Sept 1918 – 29 Oct 1918
 354th Aero Squadron (training, then Corps Observation), 30 Sept 1918 – 25 Oct 1918
 278th Aero Squadron (Corps Observation), 1 Oct 1918 – 10 Nov 1918

Badonvilliers Aerodrome 
 Unknown exact location, Badonvilliers, Meurthe-et-Moselle
 Built by 477th Aero Sqn (Construct.) 1–22 August 1918
 Apparently never used

 Belrain Aerodrome 
 Located  SSW of Belrain, Meuse
 French, then American Air Service airfield
 Headquarters, 2d Pursuit Group, 23 September – 11 December 1918
 13th Aero Squadron (Pursuit) 23 September – 6 November 1918
 49th Aero Squadron (Pursuit) 23 September – 6 November 1918
 139th Aero Squadron (Pursuit) 24 September – 7 November 1918 
 22d Aero Squadron (Pursuit) 22 September – 7 November 1918
 104th Aero Squadron (Corps Observation) 30 November 1918 – 14 January 1919
 99th Aero Squadron (Corps Observation)  31 November – 13 December 1918
 90th Aero Squadron (Corps Observation) 15 – 18 January 1918

 Bethelainville Aerodrome	 
 Located  WNW of Béthelainville, Meuse
 French and American Air Service airfield
 Headquarters, III Corps Observation Group, 29 October – 11 November 1918 
 90th Aero Squadron (Corps Observation) 19 October – 15 January 1919
 88th Aero Squadron (Corps Observation) 4–29 November 1918

 Bicqueley Aerodrome   
 Undetermined location near Bicqueley, Meurthe-et-Moselle
 French and American Air Service operational airfield
 50th Aero Squadron (Corps Observation) 8–24 September 1918

 Bonne Maison Aerodrome   
 Located  ESE of Fismes, Marne
 French 6th Army Air Service airfield from January 1917 (previously 5th Army)
 103d Aero Squadron (Pursuit), 10 April – 2 May 1918

 Chailly-en-Brie Aerodrome	
 Located  E of Chailly-en-Brie, Seine et Marne
 French and American Air Service airfield
 Headquarters, I Corps Observation Group, 12–22 August 1918 
 1st Aero Squadron (Corps Observation) 13–22 August 1918
 12th Aero Squadron (Corps Observation) 12–22 August 1918

 Chaumont-Hill 402 
 Located  ESE of Chaumont, Haute-Marne
 Headquarters, Second Army Observation Group, 25 Oct 1918 - 4 Nov 1918
 Headquarters, 1st Pursuit Wing, 24 Sept 1918 – 11 Nov 1918
 Air Service HQ and operational airfield
 91st Aero Squadron (ground training) 15 Nov 1917 – 14 Dec 1917 
 12th Aero Squadron (ground training) 16 Jan 1918 – 2 Feb 1918
 85th Aero Squadron (Observation, Second Army), 30 Sept 1918 – 4 Nov 1918
 99th Aero Squadron (General Duties) 13 Dec 1918 – 19 Feb 1919

 Coincy Aerodrome		
 Located  W of Coincy, Aisne
 French and American Air Service airfield
 94th Aero Squadron (Pursuit, advanced airfield) August 1918
 Headquarters, I Corps Observation Group, 10–12 August 1918 
 1st Aero Squadron (Corps Observation) 10–13 August 1918
 12th Aero Squadron (Corps Observation) 10–12 August 1918

 Croix-de-Metz Aerodrome (Toul) 	
 Located  NE of Toul, Meurthe et Moselle
 French and American Air Service airfield  
 Headquarters, 1st Pursuit Wing, 6 July 1918 – c. 24 September 1918
 Headquarters, 1st Pursuit Group, 5 May 1918 – 28 June 1918
 Headquarters, 2d Pursuit Group, 29 June 1918 – 23 September 1918
 Headquarters, 4th Pursuit Group, 26 October 1918 – 15 April 1919 
 Headquarters, I Corps Observation Group, 22 August 1918 – 19 September 1918
 1st Pursuit Organization and Training Center, then 1st Pursuit Group from 5 May (First Army)
 94th Aero Squadron (Pursuit), 7 April 1918 – 29 June 1918
 95th Aero Squadron (Pursuit), 4 May 1918 – 28 June 1918
 27th Aero Squadron (Pursuit), 1 – 26 June 1918
 147th Aero Squadron (Pursuit), 1 – 28 June 1918
 2nd Pursuit Group (First Army, part of the 1st Pursuit Wing from 6 July)
 13th Aero Squadron (Pursuit), 28 June 1918 – 23 September 1918
 139th Aero Squadron (Pursuit) 30 June 1918 – 24 September 1918
 103d Aero Squadron (Pursuit), 4 July 1918 – 7 August 1918
 49th Aero Squadron (Pursuit), 2 August 1918 – 23 September 1918
 22d Aero Squadron (Pursuit), 16 August 1918 – 22 September 1918
 28th Aero Squadron (3rd Pursuit Group, First Army) 15–16 July 1918 (transfer from Orly to Vaucouleurs).
I Corps Observation Group (First Army)
 1st Aero Squadron (Observ.), 22 August 1918 – 21 September 1918
 12th Aero Squadron (Observ.), 22 August 1918 – 20 September 1918
 IV Corps Observation Group (First Army, then Second Army from 14 October - HQ in Remicourt then Julvécourt)
 8th Aero Squadron (Observ.), 29 September 1918 – 23 October 1918
 135th Aero Squadron (Observ.), 30 Sept 1918 – 21 November 1918
 168th Aero Squadron (Observ.), 5 October 1918 – 21 November 1918
 85th Aero Squadron (Observ.), 10–24 November 1918
 4th Pursuit Group
 822nd Aero Squadron, then 6th Air Park Oct 1918 - April 1919
 141st Aero Squadron (Pursuit), 19 October 1918 – 19 April 1919
 25th Aero Squadron (Pursuit), 24 October 1918 – 15 April 1919
 17th Aero Squadron (Pursuit), 4 November 1918 – 12 December 1918
 148th Aero Squadron (Pursuit), 4 November 1918 – 11 December 1918
 278th Aero Squadron (VII Corps Obs. Group/First Army, 14 Nov to Second Army) 14 November 1918 - 15 April 1919

 Delouze Aerodrome		
 Located  NE of Deouze, Meuse
 American Air Service airfield
 166th Aero Squadron (Day Bomb.), 26 August – 1 September 1918; 7–12 September 1918
 11th Aero Squadron (Day Bomb.), 26 August – 6 September 1918
 20th Aero Squadron (Day Bomb.), 26 August – 7 September 1918
 100th Aero Squadron (Day Bomb.), 26 August – 26 October 1918
 163d Aero Squadron (Day Bomb.), 30 September – 1 November 1918

 Epiez Aerodrome		
 Located  W of Epiez-sur-Meuse, Meuse
 American, then French Air Service airfield
 27th Aero Squadron (Pursuit, training) 24 April – 1 June 1918
 94th Aero Squadron (Pursuit, training) 1–7 April 1918
 95th Aero Squadron (Pursuit, training) 1 April – 4 May 1918	
 147th Aero Squadron (Pursuit, training) 22 April – 1 June 1918
 104th Aero Squadron (Observation, on transit) 4–8 August 1918

 Flin Aerodrome 
 Undetermined location near Flin, SE of Chenevières OTAN/USAFE airfield, Meurthe-et-Moselle
 American Air Service airfield 
 Headquarters, I Corps Observation Group, 13 – 29 June 1918    
 12th Aero Squadron (Observation) 13 – 29 June 1918

 Foucaucourt Aerodrome		
 Located  ESE of Foucaucourt, Meuse
 French and American Air Service airfield   
 Headquarters, V Corps Observation Group, 20 Sept 1918 – 4 Feb 1919
 99th Aero Squadron (Observation),  20 Sept – 4 Nov 1918
 104th Aero Squadron (Observation), 20 Sept – 4 Nov 1918
 Headquarters, 3d Pursuit Group, 6 Nov 1918 – 31 Dec 1918
 28th Aero Squadron (Pursuit), 6 November 1918 – 15 February 1919
 93d Aero Squadron (Pursuit), 6 November – 15 December 1918
 103d Aero Squadron (Pursuit), 6 November 1918 – 5 January 1919
 213th Aero Squadron (Pursuit), 6 November – 29 January 1919

 Francheville Aerodrome	
 Located  N of Mouroux, Seine et Marne
 French and American Air Service airfield   
 Headquarters, I Corps Observation Group, 6–30 July 1918
 1st Aero Squadron (Observation) 6–22 July 1918
 12th Aero Squadron (Observation) 6–22 July 1918
 88th Aero Squadron (Observation) 7 July-4 August 1918

 Gondreville-sur-Moselle Aerodrome 
 Located  S of Gondreville, Meurthe et Moselle
 American, then French (after Armistice) Air Service airfield  
 Headquarters, 1st Army Observation Group, 6–22 September 1918
 91st Aero Squadron (Observation) 24 May – 21 September 1918
 24th Aero Squadron, (Observation) 22 August – 22 September 1918

 Goussancourt Aerodrome      
 Located on the SW side of Goussancourt, Aisne.
 French Air Service airfield  
 88th Aero Squadron (Observation) 4–9 September 1918

 Les Grèves (ferme) Aerodrome	
 Located  ESE of Château-Thierry, Picardy
 French Air Service airfield
 88th Aero Squadron (Obs) 4 Aug – 4 Sept 1918; 9 – 12 Sept 1918

 Julvécourt Aerodrome          
 Located  W of Julvécourt, Lorraine
 French then American Air Service airfield.
 Headquarters, I Corps Observation Group, 5 November 1918 – 15 April 1919
 1st Aero Squadron (Observation) 5–21 November 1918
 12th Aero Squadron (Observation) 3–21 November 1918

 La Noblette Aerodrome		 
 Located  SE of Mourmelon le Grand, Marne
 French Air Service airfield.
 103d Aero Squadron (Pursuit), 18 February – 10 April 1918

 Lay-Saint-Remy Aerodrome	
 Located  WNW of Lay-Saint-Remy, Lorraine
 American Air Service airfield.
 Headquarters 5th Pursuit Group 15 Nov 1918 – 15 April 1919
 41st Aero Squadron (Pursuit)  15 Nov 1918 – 15 April 1919
 138th Aero Squadron (Pursuit), 5 Nov 1918 – 15 April 1919
 638th Aero Squadron (Pursuit), 14 Nov 1918 – 15 April 1919

 Lemmes Aerodrome		 
 Located  N of Lemmes, Meuse
 French Air Service airfield.
 186th Aero Squadron, (Observation) 7–24 November 1918

 Lisle-en-Barrois Aerodrome	
 Located  N of Lisle-en-Barrois, Meuse.
 French then American Air Service airfield.
 Headquarters, 3d Pursuit Group, 20 September – 6 November 1918
 28th Aero Squadron (Pursuit), 20 September – 6 November 1918
 93d Aero Squadron (Pursuit), 21 September – 5 November 1918
 103d Aero Squadron (Pursuit), 20 September – 6 November 1918
 213th Aero Squadron (Pursuit), 20 September – 5 November 1918

 Longuyon area	
 Five former German wartime airfields used by American Aero Squadrons before entering Germany in December 1918
 Noërs Aerodrome located  SW of Longuyon.
 94th Aero Squadron (observation) 20 Nov - 31 Dec 1918
 Joppécourt Aerodrome  SE of Longuyon.
 166th Aero Squadron (observation) 21 Nov - 5 Dec 1918
 Mercy le Bas located  SE of Longuyon.
 1st Aero Squadron (observation) 21 Nov - 6 Dec 1918
 Mercy le Haut located  SE of Longuyon
 462nd Aero Squadron (Construct.) 20 Nov - 2 Dec 1918
 IV Corps Observation Group HQ 21 Nov - 4 Dec 1918
 12th Aero Squadron (observation) 21 Nov - 6 Dec 1918
 Preutin Aerodrome located  SE of Longuyon
 9th Aero Squadron (comm. duties) 21 Nov - 5 Dec 1918
 91st Aero Squadron (observation) 21 Nov - 2 Dec 1918

 Luxeuil-les-Bains Aerodrome	
 Located  SSW of Luxeuil-les-Bains, Franche-Comté
 French (from 1916) and American Air Services airfield.
 V Corps Infantry Liaison School
 99th Aero Squadron (Observation)  1 July – 7 September 1918
 Flight operated from Corcieux Aerodrome, 19–24 July 1918
 Flight operated from Dogneville Aerodrome, 24 July – 26 August 1918
 Headquarters, V Corps Observation Group, formation 1 – 7 Sept 1918 
 104th Aero Squadron (Observation for V Corps) 8 Aug – 8 Sept 1918
 Now: Luxeuil Air Base (BA 116)

 Manonville Aerodrome
 Located south of Thiaucourt, near Toul, it is only a possible airfield, where 85th Aero Squadron stayed 4–10 November 1918.

 Maulan Aerodrome		
 Located  SSW of Maulan, Lorraine.
 (French) and American Air Services airfield.
 Headquarters, 1st Day Bombardment Group, 25 Sept – 17 Jan 1919
 11th Aero Squadron (Day Bomb.), 24 Sept 1918 – 17 Jan 1919
 20th Aero Squadron (Day Bomb.), 23 Sept 1918 – 16 Jan 1919
 96th Aero Squadron (Day Bomb.), 23 Sept 1918 – 10 Jan 1919
 166th Aero Squadron (Day Bomb.), 25 Sept – 22 Nov 1918

 May-en-Multien Aerodrome  
 French and American Air Services airfield.
 Headquarters, I Corps Observation Group, 5–10 August 1918 
 1st Aero Squadron 5–10 August 1918  
 12th Aero Squadron (Observation) 3–10 August 1918

 Ferme de Moras Aerodrome	
 Located  E of La Ferté-sous-Jouarre, Île-de-France
 French and (temporary) American Air Services airfield.
 Headquarters, I Corps Observation Group, 30 July - 5 August 1918 
 1st Aero Squadron (Observation) 22 July – 5 August 1918
 12th Aero Squadron (Observation) 22 July – 3 August 1918

 Ourches Aerodrome		
 Located  WNW of Ourches-sur-Meuse, Lorraine
 American Air Services airfield.
 Headquarters, I Corps Observation Group, 1 April – 29 June 1918
 1st Aero Squadron (Observation) 4 April – 29 June 1918
 12th Aero Squadron (Observation) 3 May – 13 June 1918
 88th Aero Squadron (Observation) 28 May – 7 July 1918
 Headquarters, IV Corps Observation Group, 1 July – 29 September 1918
 90th Aero Squadron (Observation) 13 June – 20 September 1918
 135th Aero Squadron (Observation) 30 July – 30 September 1918
 24th Aero Squadron, (Observation) 6–22 August 1918
 8th Aero Squadron (Observation), 31 August – 29 September 1918
 Headquarters, 2d Day Bombardment Group, 1–11 November 1918 
 100th Aero Squadron (Day Bombardment), 30 Oct – 11 Nov 1918
 163d Aero Squadron (Day Bombardment), 1–11 Nov 1918

 Parois Aerodrome  
 Undetermined location near Aubréville, Lorraine
 American Air Services airfield.
 50th Aero Squadron (Observation)  28 Oct - 6 Nov 1918
 Headquarters, V Corps Observation Group, 4–11 November 1918   
 99th Aero Squadron (Observation)  4–31 November 1918
 104th Aero Squadron (Observation) 4–30 November 1918

 Pretz-en-Argonne Aerodrome  (Bregnet Field)    
 Undetermined location near Pretz-en-Argonne, Lorraine
 French and American Air Services airfield.
 88th Aero Squadron (Observation) 14–20 September 1918

 Rembercourt Aerodrome   	
 Located  ENE of Rembercourt aux Pots, now part of Rembercourt-Sommaisne, Lorraine
 French then American Air Services airfield.
 Headquarters, 1st Pursuit Group, 1 September – 11 November 1918
 27th Aero Squadron (Pursuit) 3 September – 12 December 1918
 94th Aero Squadron (Pursuit) 1 September – 20 November 1918
 95th Aero Squadron (Pursuit) 2 September – 11 December 1918
 Flight Operated from: Verdun Aerodrome, 7 Nov 1918 – unknown
 147th Aero Squadron (Pursuit) 1 September – 12 December 1918
 Flight operated from: Verdun Aerodrome, 25 Sept 1918 – unknown
 185th Aero Squadron, (Night Pursuit)) 7 October – 11 November 1918

 Remicourt Aerodrome		
 Located  W of Remicourt, Champagne-Ardenne
 French then American Air Service airfield.
 Headquarters, VII Corps Observation Group, 30 Aug – 23 Nov 1918
 Headquarters, I Corps Observation Group, 21 Sept – 5 Nov 1918 
 1st Aero Squadron (Observation) 21 September – 5 November 1918
 12th Aero Squadron (Observation) 20 September – 3 November 1918
 50th Aero Squadron (Observation) 24 September – 28 October 1918

 Saints Aerodrome  		
 Located  N of Saints, Île-de-France
 French and American Air Service airfield.
 Headquarters, 1st Pursuit Group, 9 July – 1 September 1918
 1st Aero Squadron (Observation) 29 June – 6 July 1918
 12th Aero Squadron (Observation) 29 June – 6 July 1918
 Headquarters, I Corps Observation Group, 29 June – 6 July 1918 
 27th Aero Squadron (Pursuit) 9 July – 3 September 1918
 94th Aero Squadron (Pursuit) 9 July – 1 September 1918
 95th Aero Squadron (Pursuit) 9 July – 2 September 1918
 147th Aero Squadron (Pursuit) 9 July – 1 September 1918

 Saizerais Aerodrome	  
 Located  SW of Saizerais, Lorraine
 French then American Air Service airfield.
 Headquarters, VI Corps Observation Group, 25 Oct 1918 – 15 April 1919
 8th Aero Squadron (Observation), 22 Oct – 21 Nov 1918
 354th Aero Squadron (Observation), 25 October – 15 April 1919

 Souilly Aerodrome 		
 Located  N of Souilly, Lorraine
 French and American Air Service airfield
 Headquarters, V Corps Observation Group, 7–20 Sept 1918
 99th Aero Squadron (Observation) 7–20 September 1918
 104th Aero Squadron (Observation) 8–20 September 1918
 Headquarters, III Corps Observation Group, 20 Sept – 29 Oct 1918
 88th Aero Squadron (Observation) 12–14 Sept 1918; 20 Sept – 4 Nov 1918
 90th Aero Squadron (Observation) 20 Sept – 29 Oct 1918
 13th Aero Squadron (Pursuit) 23 September – 16 December 1918
 49th Aero Squadron (Pursuit) 7 November 1918 – 7 December 1919
 22d Aero Squadron (Pursuit) 7 November 1918 – 29 January 1919
 139th Aero Squadron (Pursuit) 7 November 1918 – late January 1919
 Det. of 24th Aero Squadron (Obs), 9–18 Oct 1918, 27 Oct – 6 Nov 1918
 Det. of 91st Aero Squadron (Obs), 16 Oct 1918 – Nov 1918
 186th Aero Squadron (Observation), 29 Oct 1918 – 15 April 1919

 Touquin Aerodrome  		
 Located  WSW of Touquin, Île-de-France
 French and American Air Service airfield.
 Headquarters, 1st Pursuit Group, 28 June – 9 July 1918
 27th Aero Squadron (Pursuit) 28 June – 9 July 1918
 94th Aero Squadron (Pursuit) 30 June – 9 July 1918
 95th Aero Squadron (Pursuit) 28 June – 9 July 1918
 147th Aero Squadron (Pursuit) 28 June – 9 July 1918

 Vaucouleurs Aerodrome 	
 Headquarters, 3d Pursuit Group, 30 July – 20 September 1918 
 28th Aero Squadron (Pursuit), 16 July –20 September 1918
 49th Aero Squadron (Pursuit), 28 July – 2 August 1918
 93d Aero Squadron (Pursuit), 28 July – 24 September 1918
 103d Aero Squadron (Pursuit), 7 August –20 September 1918
 213th Aero Squadron (Pursuit), 26 July – 24 September 1918
 139th Aero Squadron (Pursuit), 28 May – 30 June 1918

 Vavincourt Aerodrome		
 Located  SSE of Vavincourt, Lorraine
 American Air Service airfield and depot
 Headquarters, 1st Army Observation Group, 22 September – 11 November 1918
 24th Aero Squadron (Obs) 22 September 1918 – 15 April 1919
 91st Aero Squadron (Obs) 21 September 1918 – 21 November 1918
 Det. operated from Souilly, 9–18 Oct 1918, 27 Oct-6 Nov 1918
 9th Aero Squadron (Night Observation) 21 Sept – 21 Nov 1918

 Verdun area 	
 Allied airfields at undetermined locations around Verdun, Lorraine
 Detachment of 27th Aero Squadron (Pursuit) 25 Sep – 12 Dec 1918
 Detachment of 95th Aero Squadron (Pursuit) 7 -11 Nov 1918

 Villeneuve-les-Vertus Aerodrome  
 Located  NE of Vertus, Champagne-Ardenne
 French Air Service airfield
 1st Pursuit Organization and Training Center January 1918 – 5 May 1918
 94th Aero Squadron (Pursuit) 5 March – 1 April 1918
 95th Aero Squadron (Pursuit) 18 February – 1 April 1918

Support aerodromes and depots

 Colombey-les-Belles Aerodrome  
 Headquarters, Commanding General, Services of Supply
 1st Air Depot. : Two airfields: Main depot, with flying ground in its northern part , and a new airfield built in April 1918 east of Colombey:   
 Initial supply and equipment depot for new units.  Army personnel/medical center. In charge of demobilizing American Air Service units after Armistice.
 Located  WNW of Colombey-les-Belles, Lorraine

 Courban Aerodrome and Depot , 
 3rd Aircraft Depot/3rd Aeroplane supply Depot (?) from May 1918 to March 1918, replaced by a French "Depot de Matérial Aéronautique No 3", in charge of demobilizing French units. The depot was built on both sides of the railway station of Courban, with surprisingly traces still visible today.

 Grand Aerodrome
 Airfield: 
 Airfield built during summer 1918; it did not see any operational use. 258th Aero Squadron arrived on 18 November 1918, followed in early 1919 by a few other squadrons bound for demobilization at Colombey-les-Belles. All were gone by mid April, then the airfield was turned back to agriculture.

 Latrecey Depot   
Nearing completion by the day of the Armistice, it was never fully operational.

 Orly Aerodrome and Depot, Paris 
 Air Service Acceptance Park No. 1
 Now: Orly Airport  

 Ravennefontaines Depot 
 6th Air Depot, operational late October 1918 - June 1919.

 Romorantin Aerodrome  
 Air Service Production Center No. 2. 
 Receiving point for all Liberty DH-4 planes shipped from the United States as well as a salvage area for wrecked airplanes.
 Located near Romorantin-Lanthenay, Centre

 St. Maixent Replacement Barracks    
 Air Service Replacement Concentration Center 
 Primary reception and classification center for new units assigned to AEF.
 Located in Saint-Maixent-l'École, Poitou-Charentes

 Vinets Aerodrome  
 5th Air Depot
 Undetermined location near Vinets, Champagne-Ardenne

 Châtenay sur Seine 
 Air Service Spare Depot

Training schools
 Aviation Instruction Centers

 1st Aviation Instructional Center (1st AIC)
 Reuilly Barracks, Paris (Headquarters)
 Mechanics Training School, with troops dispatched to the following factories:
 Hispano-Suiza Factory
 Renault Factory
 Breguet Factory
 Brasier Factory
 Nieuport Factory
 Bleriot Factory

 2d Aviation Instructional Center (2d AIC) 
 Tours Aerodrome        
 French pilot school from October 1915, control transferred to American Air Service on 1 November 1917.
 Preliminary observation, radio, photography and gunnery school 
 Located near: Tours, Centre
 Now: Tours Val de Loire Airport

 3d Aviation Instruction Center (3d AIC)  
 Issoudun Aerodrome   
  
 Advanced pursuit and observation school
 Located near: Issoudun, Centre

 4th Aviation Instruction Center (4th AIC) 
 Avord Aerodrome
  
 Largest French Air Service flying school for advance training and night flying; effective operation of 4th AIC to be confirmed...
 Location:  NW of Avord, Centre
 Now: Avord Air Base (BA 102)

 5th Aviation Instruction Center (5th AIC)
 Bron Aerodrome (Rhone), near Lyons, France
 
 Mechanics training school (closed late 1917)*

 6th Aviation Instruction Center (6th AIC)
 Numerous advance flying schools organized by French Air Service from 1915 on several airfields (one field was former Wright brothers' airfield of 1909), near Pau (Pyrenees Atlantiques), France. Effective operation of 6th AIC to be confirmed...
 7th Aviation Instruction Center (7th AIC)  
 Aulnat Aerodrome, east of Clermont-Ferrand, Auvergne.
 
 Bombardment training school with French Air Service bombardment school.
 Now: Clermont-Ferrand Airport

 8th Aviation Instruction Center (8th AIC)  
 Foggia Aerodrome
 
 Foggia, Italy

* The 5th Aviation Instruction Center at Bron (now Lyon–Bron Airport) was located at the French Air Service Mechanics School.  The first Americans were sent to the school in mid-September, 1917.  The school was overcrowded and was lacking in proper quarters and mess facilities for the Americans.  Also, a lack of English-speaking instructors led to the decision to withdraw the Americans from the school. Students were sent to the 3d AIC at Issodun, with the last departing on 4 December 1917.

 Artillery Aerial Observation Schools
 1st Artillery Aerial Observation School (1st AAOS)
 
 Coetquidan training range near Guer, in Brittany, France

 2d Artillery Aerial Observation School (2d AAOS)
  
 Souge training range, near Bordeaux, France
 Now: Former Army training grounds (airfield closed), northwest of Bordeaux–Mérignac Airport

 3d Artillery Aerial Observation School (3d AAOS)
 Mailly-le-Camp (Mailly training range), Aube. 
 Aircraft of attached 99th Aero Squadron (11 March to 31 May 1918) were stationed at Haussimont Aerodrome   , 1 km south of Haussimont, Marne.

 4th Artillery Aerial Observation School (4th AAOS)
 
 Locmaria-Grand-Champ Aerodrome, near the Meucon training range, north of Vannes, in Brittany, France

 5th Artillery Aerial Observation School (5th AAOS)
 
 Le Valdahon training range, 20 km east of Besançon, France

 Artillery Officers School (Aviation Detachment)
 
 Saint-Cyr-en-Bourg Aerodrome, on the Saumur Artillery School training grounds, south of Saumur, France 
 Observation School for Artillery Officers

 Miscellaneous AEF Schools
 Cazaux Aviation Instruction Center
 
 French aerial and anti-aircraft gunnery school created in 1915 on Cazaux Aerodrome, France; detachment of the American 2nd Aviation Instruction Center (Tours).
 Now: Cazaux Air Base (BA 120)

 Saint-Jean-de-Monts Aerial Gunnery School
 
 Saint-Jean-de-Monts Aerodrome, France

 I Corps Aeronautical School**
 Gondrecourt-le-Château, France

 II Corps Aeronautical School
 
 Chatillon-Sur-Seine Aerodrome, France

** The I Corps Aeronautical School was a temporary school, located at the French Air Service machine-gun training school at Gondrecourt-le-Château. About 225 men were sent to the school during March and April, 1918.

British sector

 Allonville Aerodrome 		 
 Approximate location: NE of Allonville, Picardy
 148th Aero Squadron (Pursuit),11–18 August 1918
 Squadron attached to British 4th Army, operated as part of the RFC/RAF 

 Auxi-le-Château Aerodrome	
 Undetermined location near Auxi-le-Château, Nord-Pas-de-Calais
 17th Aero Squadron (Pursuit), 19 August – 20 September 1918
 Detachment operated from Beugnatre Aerodrome, 10–20 September 1918
 Attached to several squadrons of the British RFC 

 Baizieux Aerodrome        
 Undetermined location near Baizieux, Picardy
 148th Aero Squadron (Pursuit), 20 September –15 October 1918
 Squadron attached to British 4th Army, operated as part of the RFC/RAF 

 Bray-Dunes Aerodrome     
 Undetermined location near Bray-Dunes, Nord-Pas-de-Calais
 103d Aero Squadron (Pursuit), 2–5 May 1918

 Cappelle Aerodrome      
 Undetermined location near Cappelle-la-Grande, Nord-Pas-de-Calais
 148th Aero Squadron (Pursuit), 30 June – 22 July 1918
 Squadron attached to British 3d Army, operated as part of the RFC/RAF 

 Petite Synthe Aerodrome 
 Undetermined location near Petite-Synthe, Nord-Pas-de-Calais    
 17th Aero Squadron (Pursuit), 20 June – 19 August 1918 
 Attached to several squadrons of the British RFC 

 Remaisnil Aerodrome           
 Undetermined location near Remaisnil, Picardy
 148th Aero Squadron (Pursuit), 18 August – 20 September 1918
 Squadron attached to British 4th Army, operated as part of the RFC/RAF 

 Beugnâtre Aerodrome 
 Located  W of Beugnâtre, Nord-Pas-de-Calais
 Detachment of 17th Aero Squadron (Pursuit), 10–20 September 1918

 Crochte Aerodrome     
 Undetermined location near Crochte, Nord-Pas-de-Calais
 103d Aero Squadron (Pursuit),  8 June – 4 July 1918

 Guinness Aerodrome  
 Undetermined location near Guînes, Nord-Pas-de-Calais  
 22d Aero Squadron (Observation) 24–26 June 1918

 Saint-Omer Aerodrome   
 Undetermined location near Saint-Omer, Nord-Pas-de-Calais   
 28th Aero Squadron (Pursuit), 24–27 June 1918

 Leffrinckoucke Aerodrome     
 Undetermined location near Leffrinckoucke, Nord-Pas-de-Calais
 103d Aero Squadron (Pursuit),  5 May – 18 June 1918

 Sonchamp Aerodrome  
 Undetermined location near Sonchamp, Île-de-France  
 17th Aero Squadron (Pursuit), 20 September – 4 November 1918

References

External links

20th-century military history of the United States
Aviation in World War I
 
 
French military-related lists
United States military-related lists